WOMT (1240 AM/107.9 FM) is a radio station in Manitowoc, Wisconsin owned by locally based Seehafer Broadcasting, which airs a mix of news, sports and adult contemporary music under a full service format, both locally spun by local staff and in the evening and weekend hours provided by Westwood One's "Adult Contemporary" network. The station serves the twin cities of Manitowoc and Two Rivers, along with Sheboygan, Algoma and Kewaunee. The station is translated on the FM dial through W300EE, which is also licensed to Manitowoc, and launched in early May 2020 as a part of the FCC's AM revitalization plan.

WOMT airs news and features from CBS Radio, including The Osgood File and commentary from Dave Ross and bottom of the hour sports updates from NBC Sports Radio, along with the locally based Money Talks financial program and several other local programs such as Be My Guest and the Air Exchange, and the Monday night Sports Talk program with Brewers Radio Network engineer Kent Sommerfeld as a regular guest. The station is the Lakeshore area's home of Brewers, Bucks, Marquette Golden Eagles, Wisconsin Badgers and Packers play-by-play, and also airs the NFL on Westwood One Sports; however the station only carries team play-by-play, forgoing the postgame shows of each radio network. The station also shares coverage of Manitowoc Lincoln, Two Rivers, and Manitowoc Roncalli High School sports with sister station WQTC-FM.

In early 2018, Seehafer Broadcasting filed for an FM translator station involving WOMT with the FCC as part of the agency's January 2018 AM revitalization translator window; the application was duplicative of one filed for WCUB, which it then decided to continue pursuing while seeking an alternate application for WOMT. Seehafer then filed a second translator application for WOMT, which was successful and launched in May 2020, at the same time as WCUB's 97.1 translator

References

External links

OMT
Radio stations established in 1926